In mathematics — specifically, in the theory of partial differential equations — a semi-elliptic operator is a partial differential operator satisfying a positivity condition slightly weaker than that of being an elliptic operator. Every elliptic operator is also semi-elliptic, and semi-elliptic operators share many of the nice properties of elliptic operators: for example, much of the same existence and uniqueness theory is applicable, and semi-elliptic Dirichlet problems can be solved using the methods of stochastic analysis.

Definition

A second-order partial differential operator P defined on an open subset Ω of n-dimensional Euclidean space Rn, acting on suitable functions f by

is said to be semi-elliptic if all the eigenvalues λi(x), 1 ≤ i ≤ n, of the matrix a(x) = (aij(x)) are non-negative.  (By way of contrast, P is said to be elliptic if λi(x) > 0 for all x ∈ Ω and 1 ≤ i ≤ n, and uniformly elliptic if the eigenvalues are uniformly bounded away from zero, uniformly in i and x.)  Equivalently, P is semi-elliptic if the matrix a(x) is positive semi-definite for each x ∈ Ω.

References

  (See Section 9)

Differential operators
Partial differential equations